O'Donnell is a surname, and an ancient and powerful Irish family.

O'Donnell may also refer to:

People
 List of people named O'Donnell
 O'Donnell baronets (1780–1889), a title in the Baronetage of Ireland

Places
 O'Donnell Peak, Antarctica
 O'Donnells, Newfoundland and Labrador, Canada
 O'Donnell, Ontario, Canada, a ghost town
 O'Donnell Park, Ireland
 Camp O'Donnell, Philippines
 O'Donnell, Capas, Tarlac, Philippines
 O'Donnell, Texas, United States
 O'Donnell High School
 O'Donnell Heights, Baltimore, Maryland, United States
 O'Donnell Street

Buildings
 Campo de O'Donnell, a multi-use stadium in Madrid, Spain
 O'Donnell Building, a historic commercial building in Evansville, Indiana, United States
 O'Donnell Hall, the Saint Louis University Museum of Art, Missouri, United States
 O'Donnell House (disambiguation)
 O' Donnell Park, a stadium in County Donegal, Ireland

Other uses
 O'Donnell's salamander (Bolitoglossa odonnelli), a salamander species
 The Rosie O'Donnell Show, an American daytime television show
 O'Donnell (Madrid Metro), a station of the Madrid Metro

See also
 O'Donnell Middle School (disambiguation)
 O'Donnell v Shanahan (2009), a UK company law case